Washburn House may refer to:

 Washburn House (Guy, Arkansas), listed on the National Register of Historic Places (NRHP) 
 George Washburn House, Calais, Maine, NRHP-listed
 Gov. Israel Washburn House, Orono, Maine, NRHP-listed
 Salmon Washburn House, Taunton, Massachusetts, NRHP-listed
 Alvin and Grace Washburn House, Orem, Utah, NRHP-listed

See also
 Elihu Benjamin Washburne House, Galena, Illinois, NRHP-listed